This is a list of post secondary educational institutions in South Africa. These institutions are not accredited degree-granting institutions. For a list of universities and other degree-granting institutions see List of universities in South Africa and List of business schools in South Africa.

See also
 Ranking of South African universities
 List of colleges and universities by country
 List of colleges and universities
 List of South African university chancellors and vice-chancellors
 List of medical schools in South Africa
 List of law schools in South Africa
 List of business schools in South Africa
 List of architecture schools in South Africa
 Higher Education South Africa
 Academic boycotts of South Africa (historical Apartheid-era)

References

Post secondary institutions
List
South Africa